5B or 5-B may refer to:

Entertainment
 Studio 5-B, a 1989 short-lived drama series about a Canadian TV news channel
 5B, the production code for the 1978 Doctor Who serial The Pirate Planet
 5B (film), a 2018 documentary about the AIDS crisis by Dan Krauss and Paul Haggis

Numbers and computing
 5B is hexadecimal for 91 (number)
 5B is the ASCII code for "["
 Thus, %5B is URL encoding for "["

Space and space exploration
 Corot-Exo-5b, an extrasolar planet
 WASP-5b, an extrasolar planet
 Little Joe 5B, an unmanned Launch Escape System test of the Mercury spacecraft

Other uses
Boron (5B), a chemical element

See also
B5 (disambiguation)